Goran Ivanišević (born 13 September 1971) is a Croatian former professional tennis player and current coach. He is the only player to win a Wimbledon singles title as a wildcard. He achieved this in 2001 while ranked world No. 125, after being runner-up at Wimbledon in 1992, 1994 and 1998. Ivanišević's career-high singles ranking was world No. 2, achieved in July 1994. He coached Marin Čilić from September 2013 to July 2016, leading Čilić to his only major title to date at the 2014 US Open. He has been coaching Novak Djokovic since 2019. Ivanišević was inducted into the International Tennis Hall of Fame in 2020.

Career 
Goran is the son of Gorana (née Škaričić) and Srđan Ivanišević. As a boy, he was trained by Jelena Genčić. He turned professional in 1988 and, later that year, with Rüdiger Haas, won his first career doubles title in Frankfurt. Although he focused mostly on his singles career, he also had some success in doubles, winning nine titles and reaching a career-high ranking of 20.

In 1989, as a qualifier he made the quarterfinals of the Australian Open. Ivanišević made his first significant impact on the tour in 1990, knocking Boris Becker out of the first round of the French Open men's singles; he went on to reach the quarterfinals. He was also, with Petr Korda, the runner-up in the French Open men's doubles. At that year's Wimbledon, Ivanišević reached the semifinals, where he lost to Becker in four sets. Ivanišević also won his first tour singles title in 1990 at Stuttgart and helped Yugoslavia win the World Team Cup. He played in eight ties for Yugoslavia in the Davis Cup before quitting the team after the Croatian declaration of independence in 1991. Yugoslavia lost its subsequent tie against France 5–0.

Ivanišević quickly became known on the tour for his strong, attacking style of play and for an extremely powerful serve. For several years, he had more aces than anyone else on the tour. He was also known for occasional on-court temper tantrums—usually directed towards himself—and the volatility of the standard of his play. Ivanišević received death threats at the 1992 Australian Men's Hardcourt Championships. He went on to win the tournament.

In 1992, Ivanišević surged his way into his first Wimbledon singles final, having defeated Ivan Lendl, Stefan Edberg, and Pete Sampras in succession. Ivanišević's 6–7, 7–6, 6–4, 6–2 semifinal victory over Sampras was particularly impressive, with Ivanišević serving 36 aces and not even facing a break point in the entire match. In the final, Ivanišević faced Andre Agassi and was heavily favored to win; with both players attempting to win their first Grand Slam title. Agassi eventually won 6–7, 6–4, 6–4, 1–6, 6–4. In the fifth set, Ivanišević had a break point on Agassi's serve at 3–3, but failed to convert it. In the final game of the match, Ivanišević served 2 double faults to start the game, even though he had only served 5 double faults in the entire match before that. Ivanišević's ace count for the tournament (206) was the highest in Wimbledon history at the time, until Ivanišević beat his own record in 2001 with 213 aces. Ivanišević served 37 aces in the 1992 Wimbledon final against Agassi, while Agassi had 37 aces in the entire tournament. Later that summer at the Olympic Games in Barcelona, Ivanišević won bronze medals in both singles and doubles representing Croatia, a state that had only recently declared independence; he also served as flagbearer for the Croatian team at the opening ceremony. In order to earn his single bronze medal, he won four consecutive 5-sets matches. He also won four singles titles that year.

Ivanišević reached the Wimbledon final for the second time in 1994, where he was defeated by defending-champion Pete Sampras 7–6, 7–6, 6–0. Ivanišević reached his career-high singles ranking of world No. 2 in July that year.

In 1995, Ivanišević won the Grand Slam Cup, beating Todd Martin in the final 7–6, 6–3, 6–4. At Wimbledon, Ivanišević again lost in the semifinals to Sampras 6–7, 6–4, 3–6, 6–4, 3–6.

In 1996, Ivanišević won a career-best five singles titles in a calendar year. He reached the Grand Slam Cup final again, but this time lost to Becker in straight sets. Ivanišević also teamed with Iva Majoli to win the 1996 Hopman Cup for Croatia. That year Ivanišević also defeated Stefan Edberg to reach the semifinals of the U.S. Open, his first Grand Slam semifinal away from Wimbledon; the match was the last Grand Slam match of Edberg's career. In the semifinals, Ivanišević fell again to Sampras, in four sets; Sampras would go on to defeat Michael Chang to win his fourth U.S. Open championship.

In April 1997, Ivanišević became the only player to defeat the "king of clay", Thomas Muster, in a Davis Cup singles match on clay. Ivanišević defeated Muster, 6–7, 7–5, 6–7, 6–2, 7–5, despite Muster having won 112 of his previous 117 matches on clay going into the match. During 1997, Ivanišević also got back up to his career high ranking of world No. 2, although his ranking fell down to No. 15 by the end of the year.

In 1998, Ivanišević reached his third Wimbledon final, facing Sampras once again. Ivanišević started the match well, but failed to take set points which would have given him a two-set lead, and Ivanišević eventually lost to Sampras in five sets, 7–6, 6–7, 4–6, 6–3, 2–6.

Ivanišević finished runner-up in the French Open men's doubles in 1999 (with Jeff Tarango). However, for much of 1999, 2000, and 2001, he struggled with a shoulder injury and his performance and world ranking began to slide steadily.

During his second round match at the 2000 Brighton International, Ivanišević was defaulted after he smashed all three of his rackets and had none available to complete the match. He told the Associated Press, "At least when I've finished playing tennis, they'll remember me for something...They'll say, 'There's that guy who never won Wimbledon, but he smashed all his rackets.'"

By the summer of 2001, Ivanišević was ranked the world No. 125. This was not sufficient to earn him an automatic place in the main draw at Wimbledon but, given his past record as a three-time runner-up, he was awarded a wildcard for entry into the singles draw. He defeated former and future world No. 1 players Carlos Moyá, Andy Roddick and Marat Safin as well as Fredrik Jonsson and Greg Rusedski to reach the semifinal, beating home favourite Tim Henman in a five set, rain-affected semifinal, setting up a match with the previous year's runner-up and former US Open champion Patrick Rafter. It was Ivanišević's first singles final since 1998. In a match lasting just over three hours, Ivanišević defeated Rafter 6–3, 3–6, 6–3, 2–6, 9–7. Two months shy of his 30th birthday, Ivanišević became the lowest-ranked player and the first wildcard entry to win Wimbledon. To date, he is the only male entrant to have won a Grand Slam singles title as a wildcard. His Wimbledon success was rated sixteenth at the list of 100 Greatest Sporting Moments by a British television programme.

On 10 July 2001, Ivanišević received a hero's welcome in his home city of Split where a crowd of over 150,000 led by local and state dignitaries greeted him at the central harbor, with a parade of boats and fireworks, topped off by Ivanišević himself taking off his clothes and jumping into the sea. Later that year he received the BBC Sports Personality of the Year Overseas Personality Award.

The 2001 Wimbledon title was the last of Ivanišević's career. He temporarily retired in 2002 due to shoulder surgery. He returned to tennis sparingly in the following years but, in 2004, retired after a third-round loss to Lleyton Hewitt at Wimbledon, held on the Centre Court, the scene of his greatest triumph. 

In 2005, he was part of Croatian Davis Cup team that won Davis Cup.

Football 
Ivanišević played football for the Croatian team Hajduk Split in 2001. A supporter of English team West Bromwich Albion, he became a fan after the Midland club's escape from Premiership relegation in 2005. He wore an Albion shirt whilst warming up prior to the 2006 BlackRock Masters final and finally watched his first match in December 2011, as West Bromwich Albion played Queens Park Rangers at Loftus Road.

Ivanišević also participated in an exhibition match of the Croatian national team of 1998 versus the International football stars on 7 October 2002 in Zagreb. It was the last career match of Croatian midfielder and team captain Zvonimir Boban. Ivanišević scored the goal for 1–1 (the game ended 2–1 for the International stars).

Playing style

Ivanisevic was a serve and volleyer and played a fast, aggressive game suited to grass courts. He was known for his powerful and accurate left-handed serve, particularly his first serve that was clutch, and is widely considered one of the most dominant servers in the history of tennis. He often won entire games without the ball being returned.

Like many serve-and-volleyers, Ivanisevic's return game and defence was weaker due to his powerful but inconsistent groundstrokes. On the backhand side, he would often use the slice instead of hitting with top-spin and use the chip-and-charge tactic to come to the net.

Grand Slam finals

Singles: 4 (1 title, 3 runner-up)

Doubles: 2

Other significant finals

Grand Slam Cup

Singles: 2 (1–1)

ATP Super 9 finals

Singles: 7 (2–5)

Doubles: 1 (1–0)

ATP career finals

Singles: 49 (22 titles, 27 runners-up)

Doubles (9–10)

Team titles 
 1990 – World Team Cup winner with Yugoslavia
 1996 – Hopman Cup winner with Croatia
 2005 – Davis Cup winner with Croatia

Performance timelines

Singles 

1 Held as Stockholm Masters until 1994, Stuttgart Masters from 1995 to 2001.

Doubles 

1 Held as Stockholm Masters until 1994, Stuttgart Masters from 1995 to 2001.

Head-to-head record vs. Top 10 ranked players
Ivanišević's record against players who held a top 10 ranking, with those who reached No. 1 in bold. The first number is Ivanišević's wins, the second refers to his opponent.

 Marc Rosset 10–4
 Yevgeny Kafelnikov 10–5
 Stefan Edberg 10–9
 Greg Rusedski 9–1
 Richard Krajicek 9–3
 Boris Becker 9–10
 Magnus Larsson 7–2
 Guy Forget 7–3
 Petr Korda 7–4
 Todd Martin 7–5
 Cédric Pioline 6–2
 Pete Sampras 6–12
 Alberto Berasategui 5–1
 Andriy Medvedev 5–3
 Sergi Bruguera 5–4
 Jakob Hlasek 5–4
 Michael Chang 5–6
 John McEnroe 4–2
 Wayne Ferreira 4–3
 Jonas Björkman 3–0
 Nicolas Kiefer 3–1
 Jonas Svensson 3–1
 Carlos Costa 3–2
 Jiří Novák 3–2
 Mark Philippoussis 3–2
 Thomas Muster 3–3
 Andre Agassi 3–4
 Thomas Enqvist 3–5
 Magnus Gustafsson 3–5
 Jim Courier 3–8
 Kevin Curren 2–0
 Thomas Johansson 2–0
 Nicolás Lapentti 2–0
 Karel Nováček 2–0
 Mikhail Youzhny 2–0
 Andrei Chesnokov 2–1
 Henri Leconte 2–1
 Alberto Mancini 2–1
 Magnus Norman 2–1
 Àlex Corretja 2–2
 Pat Rafter 2–2
 Arnaud Clément 2–4
 Michael Stich 2–5
 Gustavo Kuerten 2–6
 Kent Carlsson 1–0
 Brad Gilbert 1–0
 Sébastien Grosjean 1–0
 Martín Jaite 1–0
 Nicolás Massú 1–0
 Joakim Nyström 1–0
 Mikael Pernfors 1–0
 Andy Roddick 1–0
 Emilio Sánchez 1–0
 Jimmy Arias 1–1
 Marat Safin 1–1
 Anders Järryd 1–2
 Aaron Krickstein 1–2
 Félix Mantilla 1–2
 Rainer Schüttler 1–2
 Carlos Moyá 1–3
 Albert Costa 1–4
 Tim Henman 1–4
 Karol Kučera 1–4
 Ivan Lendl 1–5
 Guillermo Cañas 0–1
 Juan Carlos Ferrero 0–1
 Ivan Ljubičić 0–1
 Miloslav Mečíř 0–1
 Marcelo Ríos 0–1
 Tommy Robredo 0–1
 Mats Wilander 0–1
 Juan Aguilera 0–2
 Jay Berger 0–2
 Roger Federer 0–2
 Andrés Gómez 0–2
 Rafael Nadal 0–2
 Radek Štěpánek 0–2
 Lleyton Hewitt 0–3

Top 10 wins

Records 

 The only male player to win a Grand Slam title as a wildcard. He achieved this at Wimbledon in 2001.
 Most aces by any player in a single season (1,477 in 1996).

Post-playing

Senior tennis tour and other engagements
Right after retiring from the ATP Tour in 2004, Ivanišević started playing on the ATP Champions Tour (seniors' circuit).

In 2005, he was a member of the Croatian team for the Davis Cup final against Slovakia in Bratislava, although he did not play. Croatia won the final 3–2. Ivanišević received a winner's medal and his name was engraved on the trophy along with Mario Ančić, Ivo Karlović, Ivan Ljubičić and team captain Nikola Pilić.

In June 2006, he performed in the Calderstones Park tournament in Liverpool. In November of the same year, Ivanišević won the Merrill Lynch Tour of Champions tournament in Frankfurt, defeating John McEnroe 7–6(12), 7–6(1).

In 2007, Roger Federer, seeking his 5th consecutive Wimbledon title against Rafael Nadal in the final, practiced with Ivanišević. Federer said the practice session helped him against Nadal.

As of 2019, Ivanišević still takes part in tournaments on the seniors' circuit, and he is currently coaching Novak Djokovic.

On 17 July, Ivanišević faced Rafter once again in an exhibition match on 2019 Croatia Open Umag. The match was held to celebrate 18th "birthday" of the famous 2001 Wimbledon final in which Ivanišević won. Ivanišević won once again 6–4, 6–4. The Croatian Open Centre Court has also been renamed in Ivanišević's honour.

Investments
Retiring in 2004 also allowed thirty-three-year-old Ivanišević to devote more attention to investing in the real estate and construction industries, which he had already been involved with since 1998, conducting the activities through the simultaneously registered Sport Line limited liability company based in Split, Croatia. Due to Ivanišević being an active tennis player at the time of the venture's launch, most of the company's initial day-to-day business was handled by his father Srdjan. Their main activity was an ambitious undertaking—construction of a 65-unit luxury apartment building in the Split neighbourhood of Firule. Named "Lazarica 2", the building's construction was supposed to start in November 1998 and finish by late 2000. After many delays, the project finally completed in 2003, but dragged the company into debt due to many unsold units.

News of Ivanišević's financial problems first appeared in the summer of 2005 after he talked about it in an interview with Globus newsmagazine, revealing Lazarica 2 to be a "failed project", as well as admitting to being "devoured by sharks" after hastily getting into investments that in hindsight he viewed as "jumping overnight from kindergarten to university". Later that year, he also talked to the Daily Telegraph about "losing substantial amount of money" in some of his investments.

By September 2006, after months of speculation, Ivanišević joined a group of investors—including active AC Milan footballer Dario Šimić, retired basketball player Ivica Žurić as well as businessmen Marijan Šarić, Mate Šarić, and Batheja Pramod—for a joint HRK93 million (~€12.5 million) investement into the added market capitalization of Karlovačka banka. Ivanišević, Šimić, and Žurić invested HRK19 million (~€2.5 million) each, thus each obtaining 9% ownership stake in the bank.

Ivanišević's finances became news again in August 2010 after reports of his Sunseeker Predator 72 motor yacht being repossessed by Hypo Leasing Kroatien, a subsidiary of Hypo Alpe Adria Bank due to reportedly a full year of Ivanišević failing to meet his €12,000 monthly lease payments. Ivanišević would deny this, saying that the yacht was returned due to mechanical defect.

On 31 January 2013, after accumulating debts of HRK5.7 million (~€752,000), Ivanišević's company Sport Line filed for bankruptcy settlement proceedings before the Croatian Trade Court. Among the list of entities the company reportedly owed money to is the Croatian government in the amount of HRK1.1 million (~€145,000). Additionally, even his real estate business, conducted through another limited liability company, Goran promocije, was in trouble, with its account blocked for over a year with debts of HRK1.14 million. According to Croatian media reports, as of his company's 2013 bankruptcy proceedings, most of Ivanišević's assets—such as his two Zagreb apartments, his ownership stake in Karlovačka banka, and his 40,000 m2 of land in Duilovo—were safe from being sold off or liquidated as he had already signed them over to either his wife Tatjana Dragović (the Zagreb apartments and bank stake) or his mother Gorana Ivanišević (the plot of land).

Meje villa and Duilovo land controversy
Soon after his memorable 2001 Wimbledon win and the next day's rapturous hero's homecoming with 150,000 people coming out to greet him in the Split harbour, Ivanišević purchased a derelict seaside property within the Marjan hill park/forest in the neighbourhood of Meje adjacent to the city centre. Simultaneously, he also bought an undeveloped 40,000 m2 plot of land in Duilovo on the city outskirts. Despite the city's urban development plan intending the attractively located area by the sea in Meje for public use, the tennis player successfully petitioned the city authorities into changing their plan thus opening the door for tearing down the existing dilapidated structure and instead building a private use 1,000 m2 modernist villa, which Ivanišević claimed would become his family home once he retires from playing tennis professionally. Furthermore, he managed to obtain approval for the land in Duilovo to be re-purposed from green to sporting usage. In his 2001 application submission to the Split city council, the Wimbledon champion tied the two construction projects together, asking to be allowed to build a private use villa in Meje while promising to "give back to the citizens of Split and Croatian sports" by building a youth tennis academy on the plot of land in Duilovo. Furthermore, Ivanišević's application contained the following emotional appeal: "It's been a long time wish of mine to, at long last, settle down in the city of my birth, the home of my ancestors for centuries. I want to give permanence to my family's residence and I want to do so not by spatial conquest but by building a contemporary villa".

Amid vociferous exchanges in the local Split-based press invoking "civic pride" and "investor flight out of the city", including Ivanišević himself complaining about being "chased out of Split to Zagreb", the Split city council granted its hometown hero, Wimbledon champion Ivanišević, a special status for both projects: his family home construction project in Meje and his tennis academy project in Duilovo. 

By 2006, the construction of the new 1,500 m2 three-storey, five-bedroom villa designed by his relative, architect Vjeko Ivanišević on a 1,560 m2 plot of land was completed with extensive amenities such as an indoor and outdoor pool, jacuzzi, sauna, weight room, and wine cellar. During the villa's early-to-mid 2000s construction, when not in tournaments, Ivanišević (an active professional tennis player until 2004) spent most of his time in Zagreb where he had already been owning multiple residential properties. However, even after retiring in 2004, contrary to his earlier pronouncements, he never moved into the Split villa once it was complete in 2006, instead continuing to reside in Zagreb with his model girlfriend Tatjana Dragović. 

By January 2008, the retired tennis player announced the sale of his Split villa, putting it on the market for HRK57 million (~€7 million). The move instantly provoked angry reactions in the Croatian public and Split-based media outlets with accusations of "exploiting his hometown hero status" and "not only emotionally blackmailing his fellow Splićani but also outright lying to them" being directed at Ivanišević. 

After more than four years on the market and multiple re-listings with a lower asking price—including being listed in 2010 with the British real estate agency Savills that advertised it through the English press during fall 2010 as a high-end weekend escape property—the villa (that had been listed for HRK31 million as of summer 2011) was in May 2012 sold to the Hvar-born, Russia-based Croatian businessman Stefano Vlahović for an undisclosed amount widely speculated to be less than half of the amount Ivanišević originally asked for.

In addition to never using the villa as a family home, thus breaking the pledge made in his 2001 city of Split urban development plan change application, Ivanišević also failed to deliver on another promise he made in the same application—that of building a youth tennis academy in Duilovo. Instead, in 2012, the Split city authorities allowed the retired tennis player to once again re-purpose his 40,000 m2 Duilovo plot of land under the city development plan, this time for mixed usage, all of which was a prelude to Ivanišević selling the land in 2015 to the real estate developer Ciril Zovko.

Sports administration
In August 2005 Ivanišević got voted to be one of four vice-presidents of the Croatian Olympic Committee (HOO) working under president Zlatko Mateša.

Coaching
In 2013 Ivanišević began coaching compatriot Marin Čilić who won the 2014 US Open under his guidance. He split with Čilić after 2016 Wimbledon.

On 8 August 2016, Tomáš Berdych announced via social media that Ivanišević will begin coaching him, starting at 2016 Western & Southern Open.

As of 2019, he was coaching Milos Raonic until just before the Indian Wells Masters, when Raonic announced that he would be getting a new coach Fabrice Santoro.

On 30 June 2019, Novak Djokovic confirmed that he had added Ivanišević to his coaching team.

Personal life 
In 1998, Ivanišević began dating Croatian model Tatjana Dragović after reportedly seeing her on the cover of the Cosmpolitan magazine's September 1996 edition and obtaining her phone number. Ivanišević married Dragović in 2009 and they have two children, Amber Maria and Emanuel. Their official divorce proceedings, reportedly initiated by Dragović, began in April 2013. He has one child, Oliver, with his second wife Nives Čanović.

His eldest son Emanuel is also playing tennis. In 2023, he has won U-16 Croatian doubles championships.

See also 

 List of Grand Slam men's singles champions

Filmography and television

Film

Television

Music videos

Video 
 Wimbledon 2001 Final: Rafter Vs Ivanišević Standing Room Only, DVD Release Date: 30 October 2007, Run Time: 195 minutes, ASIN: B000V02CT6.

References

External links 

 
 
 

1971 births
Living people
Croatian male tennis players
Croatian expatriate sportspeople in Monaco
Franjo Bučar Award winners
Hopman Cup competitors
Laureus World Sports Awards winners
Olympic bronze medalists for Croatia
Olympic medalists in tennis
Tennis players from Split, Croatia
Tennis players at the 1992 Summer Olympics
Tennis players at the 1996 Summer Olympics
Tennis players at the 2000 Summer Olympics
US Open (tennis) junior champions
Wimbledon champions
Yugoslav male tennis players
Olympic tennis players of Croatia
Grand Slam (tennis) champions in men's singles
Medalists at the 1992 Summer Olympics
Novak Djokovic coaches
Croatian tennis coaches
Grand Slam (tennis) champions in boys' doubles
Masters tennis players
International Tennis Hall of Fame inductees